OvalX (formerly ETX Capital) is financial services product providing financial derivatives trading such as contracts for difference (CFDs) and financial spread betting and, as of 2020, corporate brokerage services.
OvalX (formerly ETX Capital) is the trading name of two operating entities including Monecor (London) Limited, authorised and regulated in the UK by the Financial Conduct Authority, and Monecor (Europe) Limited, authorised and regulated in Cyprus by the Cyprus Securities and Exchange Commission.

History 
The company was originally incorporated on 16 June 1965 as Dusrolgraph Ltd. On 30 May 1973, the company changed its name to Monecor (London) Ltd. In 2002 Monecor (London) Limited launched a retail derivatives arm called TradIndex. In 2007, the group was acquired by a joint venture between the UK-based JRJ Group and the Netherlands-based BXR Group, whereupon TradIndex was relaunched with a new name – ETX Capital. ETX is an acronym for the services the company offers; Electronic Trading, Telephone Trading and Execution Services.

In 2010, ETX Capital launched a German-language version of the website and trading platforms. The firm extended its operations to France, South Africa and Portugal in 2011. That same year, it won Best Futures & Options Broker at the 2011 Shares Awards.

ETX Denmark, ETX Romania and ETX China come online in 2013, and the company launched its affiliates program. 

Two new platforms were launched in March 2014, ETX Trader and a binary option service ETX Binary. Russian, Arabic, Turkish, Polish, Czech, Slovenian and Hungarian versions of the website became available that same year. ETX acquired Dublin-based Shelbourne markets, making the new ETX Ireland the largest Spread Betting/CFD provider in the country. ETX purchased its technology partner, Ariel, in 2014.

In 2015, ETX acquired the customer base of Alpari UK. following the collapse of the retail forex broker in January 2015.

In 2017, ETX launched a new version of its proprietary TraderPro platform and launched Bitcoin markets on the new platform. That same year, it won Best Forex Educators at the 2017 UK Forex Awards and Best Trading Education at the 2017 Shares Awards.

In 2018, ETX launched a number of new Cryptocurrencies and won 2 awards for the new TraderPro platform: Best Trading Platform at the 2018 Online Personal Wealth Awards and Best Spread Betting Platform at the 2018 ADVFN Financial Awards, as well as Best Education at the 2018 Online Personal Wealth Awards.

In October 2020, Swiss based private equity firm, Guru Capital, completed the acquisition of ETX Capital from UK based, JRJ Group.

In June 2022, ETX Capital was rebranded as OvalX. Since September 2022 Luca Merolla is the new CEO 

London FX Broker Capital.com Buys OvalX’s Client Assets

References 

Financial services companies based in the City of London
Financial services companies established in 1965
Financial derivative trading companies
1965 establishments in the United Kingdom